Yuri Leonidovich Shcherbinin, also known as Yury Sctherbinin (May 30, 1941 – November 17, 2019), was a Soviet-born Ukrainian musicologist, curator, educator, and photographer. In 2014, he founded the Treasures of Musical Kharkiv Museum; it was renamed in Shcherbinin's honor in 2020. He was also an active Wikipedian and Wikimedian.

Biography
The Shcherbinin family had been involved in culture and politics since the 18th century. An ancestor, Mikhail Andreyevich Shcherbinin, was a friend of Alexander Pushkin and had been the dedicatee of one of his poems. Another ancestor, was a governor-general of Sloboda Ukraine. By the mid-19th century, the Shcherbinin family's prominence and wealth declined, whereupon they settled in Alexandrovsk. Shcherbinin himself disdained taking pride in the achievements of one's family, telling friends that "what matters most is what you are, not who your ancestors were."

Yuri Shcherbinin was born in 1941 in Kharkov, Ukrainian SSR. His father was a factory worker; his mother was a pianist who had studied with Semyon Bogatyrev. During the Great Patriotic War, she remained in Kharkov during the German occupation, a decision which led to her arrest after the war. She was imprisoned in the Gulag, but returned to Kharkov after serving her sentence.

Shcherbinin was a precocious child talented at painting, drawing, and carpentry. After hearing Pyotr Ilyich Tchaikovsky's "Lullaby", Op. 16, no. 1, he dedicated himself to music. He was first taught piano by his mother. From 1965 to 1970, he was a student at the Leningrad Conservatory, where Pavel Serebryakov accepted him as a student after being impressed with his audition. Shcherbinin continued his studies at the Kharkov Conservatory. During his studies in Leningrad, he met Dmitri Shostakovich, Mstislav Rostropovich, and Georges Simenon; the latter gifted him a cigar as a memento.

In 1970, Shcherbinin graduated from the Kharkov Conservatory. He joined the Union of Ukrainian Composers in 1973 and remained a member for the rest of his life. There he and his wife established close friendships with Rodion Shchedrin and Maya Plisetskaya.

From 1978 to 1984 he was the director of the Kharkov Musical Vocational College named after B. M. Lyatoshynsky (formerly Kharkov Music College). From 1997 to 2000, then again from 2003 until his death, Shcherbinin was part of the faculty of the Department of Philosophy at the Ivan Kozhedub National Air Force University, where he also served as lecturer, curator, and photographer.

Shcherbinin died on November 17, 2019, in Kharkiv.

Career

Musicologist
Shcherbinin joined the Union of Ukrainian Composers (renamed the National Union of Composers of Ukraine after independence) in 1973. He was executive secretary of the Kharkiv branch 1973–1978, then again 1984–1997, and also served on the national board of the Union. As a musicologist, he promoted contemporary Ukrainian classical music and revival of interest in the culture of Sloboda Ukraine throughout his career. Starting in the 1960s, he produced radio and television programs, as well as authored over 200 publications on music.

Photography
Shcherbinin was also a professional photographer and in the course of his career photographed musicians such as Shostakovich, Sviatoslav Richter, Ivan Kozlovsky, and Tikhon Khrennikov.

Museum

On August 30, 2014, Shcherbinin, with the help of the city of Kharkiv, founded the Treasures of Musical Kharkiv Museum at the House of Culture of Ivan Kozhedub National Air Force University. The creation of the museum was a personal ambition that he and his friends had worked on for decades. In 2013, Shcherbinin and a friend, Mikhail Krasikov, petitioned the mayor of Kharkiv to erect a museum dedicated to the region's musical history. Local journalists heard about their efforts; one of them broadcast a report about it on local television, which was seen by the rector of Ivan Kozhedub National Air Force University. He later approached Shcherbinin expressing surprise about the extent of his personal collection and told him that the university would be willing to host his museum.

The museum's collection consists of memorabilia and art works from Shcherbinin's personal collection, including some of his own creation. The museum also has an exhibit dedicated to the first female conductor in Ukraine, . Many items were also donated to the museum by the families of prominent Ukrainian musicians.

The items on display at the museum account for approximately one-sixth of its total holdings. One of the university staff joked to Shcherbinin that even Kharkiv's Palace of Sports would not be big enough to hold his entire collection. Included in the collection is his archive of over 10,000 photographs, of which he had only been able to digitize a small portion.

Shcherbinin personally led guided tours through the museum and lectured to visitors about its exhibits. In 2020, the museum was renamed in his honor.

Notes

References

External links

1941 births
2019 deaths
People from Kharkiv
Saint Petersburg Conservatory alumni
Ukrainian Wikimedians
Wikipedia people
Musicologists
Ukrainian photographers
Ukrainian musicologists
Ukrainian academics
Ukrainian curators
Ivan Kozhedub National Air Force University
Soviet musicologists
Soviet academics
Soviet photographers
Ukrainian collectors
Soviet pianists
Ukrainian pianists
Curators
Ukrainian Soviet Socialist Republic people
Ukrainian people